Marine Street Beach is a public beach located in the community of La Jolla in San Diego, California, on the Pacific Ocean. It sits at the western terminus of Marine Street, with Children's Pool Beach to the north and Windansea Beach to the south. The surf has been described as rough and not suitable for children. However, the rough surf has made the beach popular with surfers and bodyboarders. Nearby kelp beds host marine life making the area a popular dive spot. 

Marine Street Beach is patrolled by lifeguards in the summer, and on peak weekends during the spring and fall. Facilities are limited, with no public bathrooms, picnic areas, or a designated parking lot. Free parking is available on surface streets in the surrounding residential neighborhood.

See also
 List of beaches in San Diego County
 List of California state parks

References

Parks in San Diego
Beaches of San Diego County, California